Du Deyin (born July 1951, in Beijing) is a politician of the People's Republic of China.

He joined the Chinese Communist Party (CCP) in 1974.

He was the Secretary of the CCP Yanqing County Committee and became the Chairman of the Beijing People's Congress Standing Committee in 2007.

Du was an alternate member of the 16th CCP Central Committee.

References 

Living people
1951 births
People's Republic of China politicians from Beijing
Chinese Communist Party politicians from Beijing
Political office-holders in Beijing